Brian Risberg Clausen, better known as Bryan Rice (born 29 May 1978 in Dåstrup, near Viby, Roskilde, Denmark), is a Danish pop singer and songwriter. He is best known for his debut single "No Promises" and for competing in the Dansk Melodi Grand Prix in 2010 and 2014.

Career
Rice released is debut single "No Promises" in October 2005. The song was released on the Nynne soundtrack. The song peaked at number 1 on the Danish Hitlisten Airplay in January 2006. The song was later covered and released by British The X Factor winner Shayne Ward reaching number two in the United Kingdom.

In April 2006 Rice released "Homeless Heart", a cover of the Amanda Stott song and also peaked at number 1 on the Danish Hitlisten Airplay in May 2006. The song was used as the opening theme to the Danish reality television program Paradise Hotel. In April 2006, Rice released his debut album, Confessional which peaked at number 4 on the Danish chart. Rice was nominated Best Danish Male Singer at the 2006 Zulu Awards.

In October 2007, Rice released his second studio album, Good News which peaked at number 36 on the Danish chart.

In 2009 Rice co-wrote the song "Underneath My Skin", with Mads Haugaard, sung by Norwegian singer Christina Undhjem, who participated in the Dansk Melodi Grand Prix.

In 2010, Rice competed in the Dansk Melodi Grand Prix with the song "Breathing", written by Peter Bjørnskov. The song finishing second.

On 25 October 2010 Rice released his third studio album, Another Piece of Me. The album features duets with Danish singer Julie Berthelsen and Swedish vocalist Emilia.

In 2014, Rice competed in the Dansk Melodi Grand Prix with the song, ""I Choose U", but the song was eliminated before the final round.

Discography

Studio albums

Live albums

Compilation albums

Extended plays

Singles as lead artist

Notes

References

External links
 

Dansk Melodi Grand Prix contestants
1978 births
Living people
21st-century Danish male singers
People from Roskilde Municipality
Danish LGBT singers
Danish LGBT songwriters